The 2022 South American U18 Women's Championship was held in Estadio Obras Sanitarias in Buenos Aires, Argentina from 4 to 9 April 2022. Brazil won the tournament.

Preliminary round

Group A

Group B

Classification 5-8 

Classification 5-8

Classification 7-8

Classification 5-6

Final round 

Semifinals

Third place

Final

Final standing

References

External links 
 Official website

U18 Women's Basketball Championship,2022
2022 in women's basketball
U18 Women's Basketball Championship
South American U18 Women's Basketball Championship
International women's basketball competitions hosted by Argentina
April 2022 sports events in Argentina
2022